MNL may refer to:

 Manila, Philippines
 Ninoy Aquino International Airport's IATA code in Pasay, Philippines
, French National High School Movement, split from Union Nationale Lycéenne
 Myanmar National League, Myanmar (Burma)'s national football league
 Multinomial logit, a generalized logistic regression model
 .mnl, a file extension for AutoCAD or OrCAD
  Manuel AKA MNL, rapper from Argentina.
  - The National Archives of Hungary (used in historical and ethnic research documents)